The Upper Anaicut (alternatively Upper Anicut), also known as Mukkombu is a dam built on the Kaveri River in the state of Tamil Nadu in southern India. The regulator dam was constructed between 1836 and 1838 by Sir Arthur Cotton, a British irrigation engineer who was inspired by the architectural beauty of Grand Anaicut canal built by Karikala Chola in Kallanai of Thanjavur district in the second century.

It is a lovely picnic spot skirting acres of verdant greenery. The place also has a well-manicured park. Mukkombu is about 685-meter long (2283 foot),

It breaks into two channels at the Upper Anaicut to form the island of Srirangam, which is enclosed in between the delta of Thanjavur (Tanjore), the garden of Tamil Nadu.

Kollidam 
Kollidam is the northern arm of the Kaveri, which branches off from the main stream about 9 miles west of Thiruchirapalli. for 17 miles
it runs parallel to Kaveri and then turns towards and very nearly reunites with it. The island thus formed is called the island of Srirangam and lies in Thiruchirapalli district. The waters of the Kollidam are largely utilized for irrigation. Across the head, where it branches from the Kaveri, stands the Upper Anicut, the dam constructed to prevent the Kollidam which runs in a lower bed than the Kaveri, from abstracting too much of the water, and so injuring the irrigation in Thanjavur dependent on the main stream.

On 22–23 August 2018, nine of the forty-five shutters had washed away due to the heavy flow of water and the weakened piers.

See also
Lower Anaicut

References

Tamil history
Chola architecture
Dams in Tamil Nadu
Dams on the Kaveri River
Tiruchirappalli district
Kaveri River
Dams completed in 1838
1838 establishments in British India